New Hampshire is a state in the New England region of the Northeastern United States. It is bordered by Massachusetts to the south, Vermont to the west, Maine and the Gulf of Maine to the east, and the Canadian province of Quebec to the north. Of the 50 U.S. states, New Hampshire is the fifth smallest by area and the tenth least populous, with slightly more than 1.3 million residents as of the 2020 census. Concord is the state capital, while Manchester is the largest city. New Hampshire's motto, "Live Free or Die", reflects its role in the American Revolutionary War; its nickname, "The Granite State", refers to its extensive granite formations and quarries. It is well known nationwide for holding the first primary (after the Iowa caucus) in the U.S. presidential election cycle, and for its resulting influence on American electoral politics.

New Hampshire was inhabited for thousands of years by Algonquian-speaking peoples such as the Abenaki. Europeans arrived in the early 17th century, with the English establishing some of the earliest non-indigenous settlements. The Province of New Hampshire was established in 1629, named after the English county of Hampshire. Following mounting tensions between the British colonies and the crown during the 1760s, New Hampshire saw one of the earliest overt acts of rebellion, with the seizing of Fort William and Mary from the British in 1774. In January 1776, it became the first of the British North American colonies to establish an independent government and state constitution; six months later, it signed the United States Declaration of Independence and contributed troops, ships, and supplies in the war against Britain. In June 1788, it was the ninth state to ratify the U.S. Constitution, bringing that document into effect.

Through the mid-19th century, New Hampshire was an active center of abolitionism, and fielded close to 32,000 soldiers for the Union during the U.S. Civil War. After the war, the state saw rapid industrialization and population growth, becoming a center of textile manufacturing, shoemaking, and papermaking; the Amoskeag Manufacturing Company in Manchester was at one time the largest cotton textile plant in the world. The Merrimack and Connecticut rivers were lined with industrial mills, most of which employed workers from Canada and Europe; French Canadians formed the most significant influx of immigrants, and today roughly a quarter of all New Hampshire residents claim French American ancestry, second only to Maine.

Reflecting a nationwide trend, New Hampshire's industrial sector declined after the Second World War. Since 1950, its economy has heavily diversified to include financial and professional services, real estate, education, transportation and high-tech, with manufacturing still higher than the national average. Beginning in the 1950s, its population surged as major highways connected it to Greater Boston and led to more bedroom communities. In the 21st century, New Hampshire is among the wealthiest and most-educated states in the U.S., with the seventh-highest median household income and some of the lowest rates of poverty, unemployment, and crime. It is one of only nine states without an income tax and has no taxes on sales, capital gains, or inheritance while relying heavily on local property taxes to fund education; consequently, its state tax burden is among the lowest in the country.

New Hampshire ranks among the top ten states in metrics such as governance, healthcare, socioeconomic opportunity, and fiscal stability.

With its mountainous and heavily forested terrain, New Hampshire has a growing tourism sector centered on outdoor recreation. It has some of the highest ski mountains on the East Coast and is a major destination for winter sports; Mount Monadnock is among the most climbed mountains in the U.S. Other activities include observing the fall foliage, summer cottages along many lakes and the seacoast, motorsports at the New Hampshire Motor Speedway, and Motorcycle Week, a popular motorcycle rally held in Weirs Beach in Laconia. The White Mountain National Forest includes most of the Appalachian Trail between Vermont and Maine, and has the Mount Washington Auto Road, where visitors may drive to the top of  Mount Washington.

History

Various Algonquian-speaking Abenaki tribes, largely divided between the Androscoggin and Pennacook nations, inhabited the area before European settlement. Despite the similar language, they had a very different culture and religion from other Algonquian peoples. English and French explorers visited New Hampshire in 1600–1605, and David Thompson settled at Odiorne's Point in present-day Rye in 1623. The first permanent settlement was at Hilton's Point (present-day Dover). By 1631, the Upper Plantation comprised modern-day Dover, Durham and Stratham; in 1679, it became the "Royal Province". Father Rale's War was fought between the colonists and the Wabanaki Confederacy throughout New Hampshire.

New Hampshire was one of the Thirteen Colonies that rebelled against British rule during the American Revolution. By the time of the American Revolution, New Hampshire was a divided province. The economic and social life of the Seacoast region revolved around sawmills, shipyards, merchants' warehouses, and established village and town centers. Wealthy merchants built substantial homes, furnished them with the finest luxuries, and invested their capital in trade and land speculation. At the other end of the social scale, there developed a permanent class of day laborers, mariners, indentured servants and even slaves.

The only battle fought in New Hampshire was the raid on Fort William and Mary, December 14, 1774, in Portsmouth Harbor, which netted the rebellion sizable quantities of gunpowder, small arms, and cannon over the course of two nights. (General Sullivan, leader of the raid, described it as "remainder of the powder, the small arms, bayonets, and cartouche-boxes, together with the cannon and ordnance stores".) This raid was preceded by a warning to local patriots the previous day, by Paul Revere on December 13, 1774, that the fort was to be reinforced by troops sailing from Boston. According to unverified accounts, the gunpowder was later used at the Battle of Bunker Hill, transported there by Major Demerit, who was one of several New Hampshire patriots who stored the powder in their homes until it was transported elsewhere for use in revolutionary activities. During the raid, the British soldiers fired upon the rebels with cannon and muskets. Although there were apparently no casualties, these were among the first shots in the American Revolutionary period, occurring approximately five months before the Battles of Lexington and Concord. On January 5, 1776, New Hampshire became the first colony to declare independence from Great Britain, almost six months before the Declaration of Independence was signed by the Continental Congress.

The United States Constitution was ratified by New Hampshire on June 21, 1788, when New Hampshire became the ninth state to do so.

New Hampshire was a Jacksonian stronghold; the state sent Franklin Pierce to the White House in the election of 1852. Industrialization took the form of numerous textile mills, which in turn attracted large flows of immigrants from Quebec (the "French Canadians") and Ireland. The northern parts of the state produced lumber, and the mountains provided tourist attractions. After 1960, the textile industry collapsed, but the economy rebounded as a center of high technology and as a service provider.

Starting in 1952, New Hampshire gained national and international attention for its presidential primary held early in every presidential election year. It immediately became the most important testing ground for candidates for the Republican and Democratic nominations. The media gave New Hampshire and Iowa about half of all the attention paid to all states in the primary process, magnifying the state's decision powers and spurring repeated efforts by out-of-state politicians to change the rules.

Geography

New Hampshire is part of the six-state New England region of the Northeastern United States. It is bounded by Quebec, Canada, to the north and northwest; Maine and the Gulf of Maine to the east; Massachusetts to the south; and Vermont to the west. New Hampshire's major regions are the Great North Woods, the White Mountains, the Lakes Region, the Seacoast, the Merrimack Valley, the Monadnock Region, and the Dartmouth-Lake Sunapee area.

The White Mountains range in New Hampshire spans the north-central portion of the state. The range includes Mount Washington, the tallest in the northeastern U.S.—site of the second-highest wind speed ever recorded— as well as Mount Adams and Mount Jefferson. With hurricane-force winds every third day on average, more than a hundred recorded deaths among visitors, and conspicuous krumholtz (dwarf, matted trees much like a carpet of bonsai trees), the climate on the upper reaches of Mount Washington has inspired the weather observatory on the peak to claim that the area has the "World's Worst Weather". The White Mountains were home to the rock formation called the Old Man of the Mountain, a face-like profile in Franconia Notch, until the formation disintegrated in May 2003. Even after its loss, the Old Man remains an enduring symbol for the state, seen on state highway signs, automobile license plates, and many government and private entities around New Hampshire.

In southwestern New Hampshire, the landmark Mount Monadnock has given its name to a class of earth-forms—a monadnock—signifying, in geomorphology, any isolated resistant peak rising from a less resistant eroded plain.

Major rivers include the  Merrimack River, which bisects the lower half of the state north–south before passing into Massachusetts and reaching the sea in Newburyport. Its tributaries include the Contoocook River, Pemigewasset River, and Winnipesaukee River. The  Connecticut River, which starts at New Hampshire's Connecticut Lakes and flows south to Connecticut, defines the western border with Vermont. The state border is not in the center of that river, as is usually the case, but at the low-water mark on the Vermont side; meaning the entire river along the Vermont border (save for areas where the water level has been raised by a dam) lies within New Hampshire. Only one town—Pittsburg—shares a land border with the state of Vermont. The "northwesternmost headwaters" of the Connecticut also define the part of Canada–U.S. border.

The Piscataqua River and its several tributaries form the state's only significant ocean port where they flow into the Atlantic at Portsmouth. The Salmon Falls River and the Piscataqua define the southern portion of the border with Maine. The Piscataqua River boundary was the subject of a border dispute between New Hampshire and Maine in 2001, with New Hampshire claiming dominion over several islands (primarily Seavey's Island) that include the Portsmouth Naval Shipyard. The U.S. Supreme Court dismissed the case in 2002, leaving ownership of the island with Maine. New Hampshire still claims sovereignty of the base, however.

Squam Lake is the second largest lake entirely in New Hampshire.

Hampton Beach is a popular local summer destination.

 
It is the state with the highest percentage of timberland area in the country. New Hampshire is in the temperate broadleaf and mixed forests biome. Much of the state, in particular the White Mountains, is covered by the conifers and northern hardwoods of the New England-Acadian forests. The southeast corner of the state and parts of the Connecticut River along the Vermont border are covered by the mixed oaks of the Northeastern coastal forests. The state's numerous forests are popular among autumnal leaf peepers seeking the brilliant foliage of the numerous deciduous trees.

The northern third of the state is locally referred to as the "north country" or "north of the notches", in reference to the White Mountain passes that channel traffic. It contains less than 5% of the state's population, suffers relatively high poverty, and is steadily losing population as the logging and paper industries decline. However, the tourist industry, in particular visitors who go to northern New Hampshire to ski, snowboard, hike and mountain bike, has helped offset economic losses from mill closures.

Environmental protection emerged as a key state issue in the early 1900s in response to poor logging practices. In the 1970s, activists defeated a proposal to build an oil refinery along the coast and limited plans for a full-width interstate highway through Franconia Notch to a parkway.

Winter season lengths are projected to decline at ski areas across New Hampshire due to the effects of climate change, which is likely to continue the historic contraction and consolidation of the ski industry and threaten individual ski businesses and communities that rely on ski tourism.

Climate

New Hampshire experiences a humid continental climate (Köppen climate classification Dfa in some southern areas, Dfb in most of the state, and Dfc subarctic in some northern highland areas), with warm, humid summers, and long, cold, and snowy winters. Precipitation is fairly evenly distributed all year. The climate of the southeastern portion is moderated by the Atlantic Ocean and averages relatively milder winters (for New Hampshire), while the northern and interior portions experience colder temperatures and lower humidity. Winters are cold and snowy throughout the state, and especially severe in the northern and mountainous areas.

Average daytime highs are in the mid 70s°F to low 80s°F (24–28 °C) throughout the state in July, with overnight lows in the mid 50s°F to low 60s°F (13–15 °C). Mount Washington also saw an unofficial  reading on January 22, 1885, which, if made official, would tie the record low for New England (also  at Big Black River, Maine, on January 16, 2009, and Bloomfield, Vermont on December 30, 1933).

Extreme snow is often associated with a nor'easter, such as the Blizzard of '78 and the Blizzard of 1993, when several feet accumulated across portions of the state over 24 to 48 hours. Lighter snowfalls of several inches occur frequently throughout winter, often associated with an Alberta Clipper.

New Hampshire, on occasion, is affected by hurricanes and tropical storms—although, by the time they reach the state, they are often extratropical—with most storms striking the southern New England coastline and moving inland or passing by offshore in the Gulf of Maine. Most of New Hampshire averages fewer than 20 days of thunderstorms per year and an average of two tornadoes occur annually statewide.

The National Arbor Day Foundation plant hardiness zone map depicts zones 3, 4, 5, and6 occurring throughout the state and indicates the transition from a relatively cooler to warmer climate as one travels southward across New Hampshire. The 1990 USDA plant hardiness zones for New Hampshire range from zone 3b in the north to zone 5b in the south.

Metropolitan areas

Metropolitan areas in the New England region are defined by the U.S. Census Bureau as New England City and Town Areas (NECTAs). The following is a list of NECTAs fully or partially in New Hampshire:

 Berlin
 Boston–Cambridge–Nashua
 Haverhill–Newburyport–Amesbury Town NECTA Division
 Lawrence–Methuen Town–Salem NECTA Division
 Lowell–Billerica–Chelmsford NECTA Division
 Nashua NECTA Division
 Claremont
 Concord
 Dover–Durham
 Franklin
 Keene
 Laconia
 Lebanon
 Manchester
 Portsmouth

Demographics

Population

As of the 2020 US census, the resident population of New Hampshire was 1,377,529, a 4.6% increase since the 2010 United States Census. The center of population of New Hampshire is in Merrimack County, in the town of Pembroke. The center of population has moved south  since 1950, a reflection of the fact that the state's fastest growth has been along its southern border, which is within commuting range of Boston and other Massachusetts cities.

As indicated in the census, in 2020 92.8% of the population were White; 1.9% were Black or African American; 0.3% were Native American or Alaskan Native; 3.1% were Asian; 0.1% were Native Hawaiian or other Pacific Islander; and 1.8% were two or more races. 4.4% of the total population were Hispanic or Latino of any race. 18.5% of the population were under 18 years of age; 19.2% were 65 years and over. The female population was 50.1%.

The most densely populated areas generally lie within  of the Massachusetts border, and are concentrated in two areas: along the Merrimack River Valley running from Concord to Nashua, and in the Seacoast Region along an axis stretching from Rochester to Portsmouth. Outside of those two regions, only one community, the city of Keene, has a population of over 20,000. The four counties covering these two areas account for 72% of the state population, and one (Hillsborough) has nearly 30% of the state population, as well as the two most populous communities, Manchester and Nashua. The northern portion of the state is very sparsely populated: the largest county by area, Coos, covers the northern one-fourth of the state and has only around 31,000 people, about a third of whom live in a single community (Berlin). The trends over the past several decades have been for the population to shift southward, as many northern communities lack the economic base to maintain their populations, while southern communities have been absorbed by the Greater Boston metropolis. 

As of the 2010 census, the population of New Hampshire was 1,316,470. The gender makeup of the state at that time was 49.3% male and 50.7% female. 21.8% of the population were under the age of 18; 64.6% were between the ages of 18 and 64; and 13.5% were 65 years of age or older. Additionally, about 57.3% of the population was born out of state.

According to HUD's 2022 Annual Homeless Assessment Report, there were an estimated 1,605 homeless people in New Hampshire. 

Hispanic or Latino of any race were 2.8% of the population in 2010: 0.6% were of Mexican, 0.9% Puerto Rican, 0.1% Cuban, and 1.2% other Hispanic or Latino origin. As of 2019, the Hispanic or Latino population was estimated at 4.0%.

According to the 2012–2017 American Community Survey, the largest ancestry groups in the state were Irish (20.6%), English (16.5%), French (14.0%), Italian (10.4%), German (9.1%), French Canadian (8.9%), and American (4.8%).

New Hampshire has the highest percentage (22.9%) of residents with French/French-Canadian/Acadian ancestry of any U.S. state.

According to the Census Bureau's American Community Survey estimates from 2017, 2.1% of the population aged5 and older speak Spanish at home, while 1.8% speak French. In Coos County, 9.6% of the population speaks French at home, down from 16% in 2000.

Birth data
Note: Percentages in the table do not add up to 100, because Hispanics are counted both by their ethnicity and by their race, giving a higher overall number.

 Since 2016, data for births of White Hispanic origin are not collected, but included in one Hispanic group; persons of Hispanic origin may be of any race.

Religion

A Pew survey in 2014 showed that the religious affiliations of the people of New Hampshire was as follows: nonreligious 36%, Protestant 30%, Catholic 26%, Jehovah's Witness 2%, LDS (Mormon) 1%, and Jewish 1%.

A survey suggests people in New Hampshire and Vermont are less likely than other Americans to attend weekly services and only 54% say they are "absolutely certain there is a God" compared to 71% in the rest of the nation. New Hampshire and Vermont are also at the lowest levels among states in religious commitment. In 2012, 23% of New Hampshire residents in a Gallup poll considered themselves "very religious", while 52% considered themselves "non-religious". According to the Association of Religion Data Archives (ARDA) in 2010, the largest denominations were the Catholic Church with 311,028 members; the United Church of Christ with 26,321 members; and the United Methodist Church with 18,029 members.

In 2016, a Gallup Poll found that New Hampshire was the least religious state in the United States. Only 20% of respondents in New Hampshire categorized themselves as "very religious", while the nationwide average was 40%.

According to the 2020 Public Religion Research Institute study, 64% of the population was Christian, dominated by Roman Catholicism and evangelical Protestantism. In contrast with varying studies of estimated irreligiosity, the Public Religion Research Institute reported that irreligion declined from 36% at the separate 2014 Pew survey to 25% of the population in 2020.

Economy

 Total employment (2016): 594,243
 Number of employer establishments: 37,868

The Bureau of Economic Analysis estimates that New Hampshire's total state product in 2018 was $86billion, ranking 40th in the United States. Median household income in 2017 was $74,801, the fourth highest in the country (including Washington, DC). Its agricultural outputs are dairy products, nursery stock, cattle, apples and eggs. Its industrial outputs are machinery, electric equipment, rubber and plastic products, and tourism is a major component of the economy.

New Hampshire experienced a major shift in its economic base during the 20th century. Historically, the base was composed of traditional New England textiles, shoemaking, and small machine shops, drawing upon low-wage labor from nearby small farms and parts of Quebec. Today, of the state's total manufacturing dollar value, these sectors contribute only two percent for textiles, two percent for leather goods, and nine percent for machining. They experienced a sharp decline due to obsolete plants and the lure of cheaper wages in the Southern United States.

New Hampshire today has a broad-based and growing economy, with a state GDP growth rate of 2.2% in 2018. The state's largest economic sectors in 2018, based on contribution to GDP, are: 15% real estate and rental and leasing; 13% professional business services; 12% manufacturing; 10% government and government services; and 9% health care and social services.

The state's budget in FY2018 was $5.97billion, including $1.79billion in federal funds. The issue of taxation is controversial in New Hampshire, which has a property tax (subject to municipal control) but no broad sales tax or income tax. The state does have narrower taxes on meals, lodging, vehicles, business and investment income, and tolls on state roads.

According to the Energy Information Administration, New Hampshire's energy consumption and per capita energy consumption are among the lowest in the country. The Seabrook Station Nuclear Power Plant, near Portsmouth, is the largest nuclear reactor in New England and provided 57% of New Hampshire's electricity generation and 27% of its electricity consumption in 2017. In 2016 and 2017, New Hampshire obtained more of its electricity generation from wind power than from coal-fired power plants. Approximately 32% of New Hampshire's electricity consumption came from renewable resources (including nuclear, hydroelectric, wind, and other renewable resources). New Hampshire was a net exporter of electricity, exporting .

New Hampshire's residential electricity use is low compared with the national average, in part because demand for air conditioning is low during the generally mild summer months and because few households use electricity as their primary energy source for home heating. Nearly half of New Hampshire households use fuel oil for winter heating, which is one of the largest shares in the United States. New Hampshire has potential for renewable energies like wind power, hydroelectricity, and wood fuel.

The state has no general sales tax and no personal state income tax (the state currently does tax, at a five percent rate, income from dividends and interest, but this tax is set to expire in 2027.)

New Hampshire's lack of a broad-based tax system has resulted in the state's local jurisdictions having the 8th-highest property taxes as of a 2019 ranking by the Tax Foundation. However, the state's overall tax burden is relatively low; in 2010 New Hampshire ranked 8th-lowest among states in combined average state and local tax burden.

The (preliminary) seasonally unemployment rate in April 2019 was 2.4% based on a 767,500 person civilian workforce with 749,000 people in employment. New Hampshire's workforce is 90% in nonfarm employment, with 18% employed in trade, transportation, and utilities; 17% in education and health care; 12% in government; 11% in professional and business services; and 10% in leisure and hospitality.

Largest employers
In March 2018, 86% of New Hampshire's workforce were employed by the private sector, with 53% of those workers being employed by firms with fewer than 100 employees. About 14% of private-sector employees are employed by firms with more than 1,000 employees.

According to community surveys by the Economic & Labor Market Information Bureau of NH Employment Security, the following are the largest private employers in the state:

New Hampshire's state government employs approximately 6,100 people. Additionally, the U.S. Department of State employs approximately 1,600 people at the National Visa Center in Portsmouth, which processes United States immigrant visa petitions.

Law and government

The governor of New Hampshire, since January 5, 2017, is Chris Sununu (Republican). New Hampshire's two U.S. senators are Jeanne Shaheen and Maggie Hassan (both Democrats), both of whom are former governors. New Hampshire's two U.S. representatives as of January 2019 are Chris Pappas and Ann McLane Kuster (both Democrats).

New Hampshire is an alcoholic beverage control state, and through the State Liquor Commission takes in $100million from the sale and distribution of liquor.

New Hampshire is the only state in the U.S. that does not require adults to wear seat belts in their vehicles. It is one of three states that have no mandatory helmet law.

Governing documents

The New Hampshire State Constitution of 1783 is the supreme law of the state, followed by the New Hampshire Revised Statutes Annotated and the New Hampshire Code of Administrative Rules. These are roughly analogous to the federal United States Constitution, United States Code and Code of Federal Regulations respectively.

Branches of government
New Hampshire has a bifurcated executive branch, consisting of the governor and a five-member executive council which votes on state contracts worth more than $5,000 and "advises and consents" to the governor's nominations to major state positions such as department heads and all judgeships and pardon requests. New Hampshire does not have a lieutenant governor; the Senate president serves as "acting governor" whenever the governor is unable to perform the duties.

The legislature is called the General Court. It consists of the House of Representatives and the Senate. There are 400 representatives, making it one of the largest elected bodies in the English-speaking world, and 24 senators. Legislators are paid a nominal salary of $200 per two-year term plus travel costs, the lowest in the U.S. by far. Thus most are effectively volunteers, nearly half of whom are retirees. (For details, see the article on Government of New Hampshire.)

The state's sole appellate court is the New Hampshire Supreme Court. The Superior Court is the court of general jurisdiction and the only court which provides for jury trials in civil or criminal cases. The other state courts are the Probate Court, District Court, and the Family Division.

Local government
New Hampshire has 10 counties and 234 cities and towns.

New Hampshire is a "Dillon Rule" state, meaning the state retains all powers not specifically granted to municipalities. Even so, the legislature strongly favors local control, particularly concerning land use regulations. New Hampshire municipalities are classified as towns or cities, which differ primarily by the form of government. Most towns generally operate on the town meeting form of government, where the registered voters in the town act as the town legislature, and a board of selectmen acts as the executive of the town. Larger towns and the state's thirteen cities operate either on a council–manager or council–mayor form of government. There is no difference, from the state government's point of view, between towns and cities besides the form of government. All state-level statutes treat all municipalities identically.

New Hampshire has a small number of unincorporated areas that are titled as grants, locations, purchases, or townships. These locations have limited to no self-government, and services are generally provided for them by neighboring towns or the county or state where needed. As of the 2000 census, there were 25 of these left in New Hampshire, accounting for a total population of 173 people; several were entirely depopulated. All but two of these unincorporated areas are in Coos County.

Politics

New Hampshire is socially liberal like the rest of New England, and is the least religious state in the Union as of a 2016 Gallup poll. Yet the Live Free or Die state has also long had a great disdain for state taxation and state bureaucracy. As of 2021, New Hampshire has a Republican Governor (Chris Sununu), a Republican New Hampshire Senate and a Republican New Hampshire House of Representatives, and is one of nine states (the only one of the American Northeast) to have no general state income tax imposed on individuals.

The Democratic Party and the Republican Party, in that order, are the two largest parties in the state. A plurality of voters are registered as undeclared, and can choose either ballot in the primary and then regain their undeclared status after voting. The Libertarian Party had official party status from 1990 to 1996 and from 2016 to 2018. A movement known as the Free State Project suggests libertarians move to the state to concentrate their power. As of August 30, 2022, there were 869,863 registered voters, of whom 332,008 (38.17%) did not declare a political party affiliation, 273,921 (31.49%) were Democratic, and 263,934 (30.34%) were Republican.

New Hampshire primary

New Hampshire is internationally known for the New Hampshire primary, the first primary in the quadrennial American presidential election cycle. State law requires that the Secretary of State schedule this election at least one week before any "similar event". While the Iowa caucus precedes the New Hampshire primary, the New Hampshire election is the nation's first contest that uses the same procedure as the general election, draws more attention than those in other states, and has been decisive in shaping the national contest.

In February 2023, the Democratic National Committee awarded that party's first primary to South Carolina, to be held on February 3, 2024, directing New Hampshire and Nevada to vote three days later.  New Hampshire political leaders from both parties have vowed to stand by the state's "first in the nation" law and ignore the DNC.

State law permits a town with fewer than 100 residents to open its polls at midnight and close when all registered citizens have cast their ballots. As such, the communities of Dixville Notch in Coos County and Hart's Location in Carroll County, among others, have chosen to implement these provisions. Dixville Notch and Hart's Location are traditionally the first places in both New Hampshire and the U.S. to vote in presidential primaries and elections.

Nominations for all other partisan offices are decided in a separate primary election. In Presidential election cycles, this is the second primary election held in New Hampshire.

Saint Anselm College in Goffstown has become a popular campaign spot for politicians as well as several national presidential debates because of its proximity to Manchester-Boston Regional Airport.

Elections

In the past, New Hampshire has often voted Republican. Between 1856 and 1988, New Hampshire cast its electoral votes for the Democratic presidential ticket six times: Woodrow Wilson (twice), Franklin D. Roosevelt (three times), and Lyndon B. Johnson (once).

Beginning in 1992, New Hampshire became a swing state in national and local elections, and in that time has supported Democrats in all presidential elections except 2000. It was the only state in the country to switch from supporting Republican George W. Bush in the 2000 election to supporting his Democratic challenger in the 2004 election, when John Kerry, a senator from neighboring Massachusetts, won the state.

The Democrats dominated elections in New Hampshire in 2006 and 2008. In 2006, Democrats won both congressional seats (electing Carol Shea-Porter in the first district and Paul Hodes in the second), re-elected Governor John Lynch, and gained a majority on the Executive Council and in both houses for the first time since 1911. Democrats had not held both the legislature and the governorship since 1874. Neither U.S. Senate seat was up for a vote in 2006. In 2008, Democrats retained their majorities, governorship, and Congressional seats; and former governor Jeanne Shaheen defeated incumbent Republican John E. Sununu for the U.S. Senate in a rematch of the 2002 contest.

The 2008 elections resulted in women holding a majority, 13 of the 24 seats, in the New Hampshire Senate, a first for any legislative body in the United States.

In the 2010 midterm elections, Republicans made historic gains in New Hampshire, capturing veto-proof majorities in the state legislature, taking all five seats in the Executive Council, electing a new U.S. senator, Kelly Ayotte, winning both U.S. House seats, and reducing the margin of victory of incumbent Governor John Lynch compared to his 2006 and 2008 landslide wins.

In the 2012 state legislative elections, Democrats took back the New Hampshire House of Representatives and narrowed the Republican majority in the New Hampshire Senate to 13–11. In 2012, New Hampshire became the first state in U.S. history to elect an all-female federal delegation: Democratic Congresswomen Carol Shea-Porter of Congressional District 1 and Ann McLane Kuster of Congressional District 2 accompanied U.S. Senators Jeanne Shaheen and Kelly Ayotte in 2013. Further, the state elected its second female governor: Democrat Maggie Hassan.

In the 2014 elections, Republicans retook the New Hampshire House of Representatives with a 239–160 majority and expanded their majority in the New Hampshire Senate to 14 of the Senate's 24 seats. On the national level, incumbent Democratic Senator Jeanne Shaheen defeated her Republican challenger, former Massachusetts senator Scott Brown. New Hampshire also elected Frank Guinta (R) for its First Congressional District representative and Ann Kuster (D) for its Second Congressional District representative.

In the 2016 elections, Republicans held the New Hampshire House of Representatives with a majority of 220–175 and held onto their 14 seats in the New Hampshire Senate. In the gubernatorial race, retiring Governor Maggie Hassan was succeeded by Republican Chris Sununu, who defeated Democratic nominee Colin Van Ostern. Sununu became the state's first Republican governor since Craig Benson, who left office in 2005 following defeat by John Lynch. Republicans control the governor's office and both chambers of the state legislature, a governing trifecta in which the Republicans have full governing power. In the presidential race, the state voted for the Democratic nominee, former Secretary of State Hillary Clinton over the Republican nominee, Donald Trump, by a margin of 2,736 votes, or 0.3%, one of the closest results the state has ever seen in a presidential race, while Libertarian nominee Gary Johnson received 4.12% of the vote. The Democrats also won a competitive race in the Second Congressional District, as well as a competitive senate race. New Hampshire's congressional delegation currently consists of exclusively Democrats. In the 116th United States Congress, it is one of only seven states with an entirely Democratic delegation, five of which are in New England (the others are Delaware and Hawaii).

Free State Project
The Free State Project (FSP) is a movement founded in 2001 to recruit at least 20,000 libertarians to move to a single low-population state (New Hampshire, was selected in 2003), to concentrate libertarian activism around a single region. The Free State Project emphasizes decentralized decision-making, encouraging new movers and prior residents of New Hampshire to participate in a way the individual mover deems most appropriate. For example, as of 2017, there were 17 so-called Free Staters elected to the New Hampshire House of Representatives, and in 2021, the New Hampshire Liberty Alliance, which ranks bills and elected representatives based on their adherence to what they see as libertarian principles, scored 150 representatives as "A-" or above rated representatives. Participants also engage with other like-minded activist groups such as Rebuild New Hampshire, Young Americans for Liberty, and Americans for Prosperity.  As of April 2022, approximately 6,232 participants have moved to New Hampshire for the Free State Project.

Transportation

Highways

New Hampshire has a well-maintained, well-signed network of Interstate highways, U.S. highways, and state highways. State highway markers still depict the Old Man of the Mountain despite that rock formation's demise in 2003. Several route numbers align with the same route numbers in neighboring states. State highway numbering is arbitrary, with no overall system as with U.S. and Interstate systems. Major routes include:
  Interstate 89 runs northwest from near Concord to Lebanon on the Vermont border.
  Interstate 93 is the main Interstate highway in New Hampshire and runs north from Salem (on the Massachusetts border) to Littleton (on the Vermont border). I-93 connects the more densely populated southern part of the state to the Lakes Region and the White Mountains further to the north.
  Interstate 95 runs north–south briefly along New Hampshire's seacoast to serve the city of Portsmouth, before entering Maine
  U.S. Route 1 runs north–south briefly along New Hampshire's seacoast to the east of and paralleling I-95.
  U.S. Route 2 runs east–west through Coos County from Maine, intersecting Route 16, skirting the White Mountain National Forest passing through Jefferson and into Vermont.
  U.S. Route 3 is the longest numbered route in the state, and the only one to run completely through the state from the Massachusetts border to the Canada–U.S. border. It generally parallels Interstate 93. South of Manchester, it takes a more westerly route through Nashua. North of Franconia Notch, U.S.3 takes a more easterly route, before terminating at the Canada–U.S. border.
  U.S. Route 4 terminates at the Portsmouth Traffic Circle and runs east–west across the southern part of the state connecting Durham, Concord, Boscawen, and Lebanon.
  New Hampshire Route 16 is a major north–south highway in the eastern part of the state that generally parallels the border with Maine, eventually entering Maine as Maine Route 16. The southernmost portion of NH 16 is a four-lane freeway, co-signed with U.S. Route4.
  New Hampshire Route 101 is a major east–west highway in the southern part of the state that connects Keene with Manchester and the Seacoast region. East of Manchester, NH 101 is a four-lane, limited-access highway that runs to Hampton Beach and I-95.

Air

New Hampshire has 25 public-use airports, three with some scheduled commercial passenger service. The busiest airport by number of passengers handled is Manchester-Boston Regional Airport in Manchester and Londonderry, which serves the Greater Boston metropolitan area.

Public transportation
Long-distance intercity passenger rail service is provided by Amtrak's Vermonter and Downeaster lines.

Greyhound, Concord Coach, Vermont Translines, and Dartmouth Coach all provide intercity bus connections to and from points in New Hampshire and to long-distance points beyond and in between.

, Boston-centered MBTA Commuter Rail services reach only as far as northern Massachusetts. The New Hampshire Rail Transit Authority is working to extend "Capital Corridor" service from Lowell, Massachusetts, to Nashua, Concord, and Manchester, including Manchester-Boston Regional Airport; and "Coastal Corridor" service from Haverhill, Massachusetts, to Plaistow, New Hampshire. Legislation in 2007 created the New Hampshire Rail Transit Authority (NHRTA) with the goal of overseeing the development of commuter rail in the state of New Hampshire. In 2011, Governor John Lynch vetoed HB 218, a bill passed by Republican lawmakers, which would have drastically curtailed the powers and responsibilities of NHRTA. The I-93 Corridor transit study suggested a rail alternative along the Manchester and Lawrence branch line which could provide freight and passenger service. This rail corridor would also have access to Manchester-Boston Regional Airport.

Eleven public transit authorities operate local and regional bus services around the state, and eight private carriers operate express bus services which link with the national intercity bus network. The New Hampshire Department of Transportation operates a statewide ride-sharing match service, in addition to independent ride matching and guaranteed ride home programs.

Tourist railroads include the Conway Scenic Railroad, Hobo-Winnipesaukee Railroad, and the Mount Washington Cog Railway.

Freight railways

Freight railways in New Hampshire include Claremont & Concord Railroad (CCRR), Pan Am Railways via subsidiary Springfield Terminal Railway (ST), the New England Central Railroad (NHCR), the St. Lawrence and Atlantic Railroad (SLR), and New Hampshire Northcoast Corporation (NHN).

Education

High schools

The first public high schools in the state were the Boys' High School and the Girls' High School of Portsmouth, established either in 1827 or 1830, depending on the source.

New Hampshire has more than 80 public high schools, many of which serve more than one town. The largest is Pinkerton Academy in Derry, which is owned by a private non-profit organization and serves as the public high school of several neighboring towns. There are at least 30 private high schools in the state.

New Hampshire is also the home of several prestigious university-preparatory schools, such as Phillips Exeter Academy, St. Paul's School, Proctor Academy, Brewster Academy, and Kimball Union Academy.

In 2008, the state tied with Massachusetts as having the highest scores on the SAT and ACT standardized tests given to high school students.

Colleges and universities

 Antioch University New England
 Colby-Sawyer College
 Community College System of New Hampshire:
 Great Bay Community College
 Lakes Region Community College
 Manchester Community College
 Nashua Community College
 NHTI, Concord's Community College
 River Valley Community College
 White Mountains Community College
 Dartmouth College
 Tuck School of Business
 Geisel School of Medicine
 Thayer School of Engineering
 Franklin Pierce University
 Hellenic American University
 Magdalen College of the Liberal Arts
 MCPHS University
 New England College
 New Hampshire Institute of Art
 Rivier University
 Saint Anselm College
 Southern New Hampshire University
 Thomas More College of Liberal Arts
 University System of New Hampshire:
 University of New Hampshire
 University of New Hampshire School of Law
 University of New Hampshire at Manchester
 Granite State College
 Keene State College
 Plymouth State University

Media

Daily newspapers

 Berlin Daily Sun
 Concord Monitor
 Conway Daily Sun
 Eagle Times of Claremont
 Eagle Tribune (Lawrence, Massachusetts area, including parts of southern New Hampshire)
 Foster's Daily Democrat of Dover
 Keene Sentinel
 Laconia Daily Sun
 New Hampshire Union Leader of Manchester, formerly known as the Manchester Union Leader
 The Portsmouth Herald
 The Sun (Lowell, Massachusetts area, including parts of southern New Hampshire)
 Valley News of Lebanon

Other publications

 Area News Group
 Business New Hampshire Magazine
 The Cabinet Press
 Milford Cabinet
 Bedford Journal
 Hollis/Brookline Journal
 Merrimack Journal
 Carriage Towne News (covering Kingston and surrounding towns)
 The Dartmouth (Dartmouth College student newspaper)
 The Exeter News-Letter
 Free Keene
 The Hampton Union
 Hippo Press (covering Manchester, Nashua, and Concord)
 The Liberty Block
 Manchester Express
 Manchester Ink Link
 The New Hampshire (University of New Hampshire student newspaper)
 New Hampshire Business Review
 New Hampshire Free Press
 The New Hampshire Gazette (Portsmouth alternative biweekly)
 NH Living Magazine
 NH Rocks
 NH Roots
 Salmon Press Newspapers (family of weekly newspapers covering Lakes Region & North Country)

 The Telegraph of Nashua

Radio stations

Television stations

 ABC affiliate WMUR, Channel 9, Manchester
 PBS affiliate Channel 11, Durham (New Hampshire Public Television); repeater stations in Keene and Littleton
 True Crime Network affiliate WWJE, Channel 50, Derry/Manchester
 Ion Television station WPXG, Channel 21, Concord (satellite of WBPX in Boston)

Sports
The following sports teams are based in New Hampshire:

The New Hampshire Motor Speedway in Loudon is an oval track and road course that has been visited by national motorsport championship series such as the NASCAR Cup Series, the NASCAR Xfinity Series, the NASCAR Camping World Truck Series, NASCAR Whelen Modified Tour, American Canadian Tour (ACT), the Champ Car and the IndyCar Series. Other motor racing venues include Star Speedway and New England Dragway in Epping, Lee USA Speedway in Lee, Twin State Speedway in Claremont, Monadnock Speedway in Winchester and Canaan Fair Speedway in Canaan.

New Hampshire has two universities competing at the NCAA Division I in all collegiate sports: the Dartmouth Big Green (Ivy League) and the New Hampshire Wildcats (America East Conference), as well as three NCAA Division II teams: Franklin Pierce Ravens, Saint Anselm Hawks, and Southern New Hampshire Penmen (Northeast-10 Conference). Most other schools compete in NCAA Division III or the NAIA.

Annually since 2002, high-school statewide all-stars compete against Vermont in 10 sports during "Twin State" playoffs.

Culture
In the spring, New Hampshire's many sap houses hold sugaring-off open houses. In summer and early autumn, New Hampshire is home to many county fairs, the largest being the Hopkinton State Fair, in Contoocook. New Hampshire's Lakes Region is home to many summer camps, especially around Lake Winnipesaukee, and is a popular tourist destination. The Peterborough Players have performed every summer in Peterborough since 1933. The Barnstormers Theatre in Tamworth, founded in 1931, is one of the longest-running professional summer theaters in the United States.

In September, New Hampshire is host to the New Hampshire Highland Games. New Hampshire has also registered an official tartan with the proper authorities in Scotland, used to make kilts worn by the Lincoln Police Department while its officers serve during the games. The fall foliage peaks in mid-October. In the winter, New Hampshire's ski areas and snowmobile trails attract visitors from a wide area. After the lakes freeze over they become dotted with ice fishing ice houses, known locally as bobhouses.

Funspot, the world's largest video arcade (now termed a museum), is in Laconia.

In fiction

Theater
 The fictional New Hampshire town of Grover's Corners serves as the setting of the Thornton Wilder play Our Town. Grover's Corners is based, in part, on the real town of Peterborough. Several local landmarks and nearby towns are mentioned in the text of the play, and Wilder himself spent some time in Peterborough at the MacDowell Colony, writing at least some of the play while in residence there.

Comics
 Al Capp, creator of the comic strip Li'l Abner, used to joke that Dogpatch, the setting for the strip, was based on Seabrook, where he would vacation with his wife.

Television
 In the AMC drama Breaking Bad ("Granite State") series lead Walter White escapes to a cabin in a fictional county in northern New Hampshire.
 In the sixth season of HBO hit series The Sopranos, in an episode named for New Hampshire's famous slogan of "Live Free or Die", character Vito Spatafore flees New Jersey for the small fictional town of Dartford, New Hampshire, because of his inadvertently being outed as a gay man.

Notable people

Prominent individuals from New Hampshire include 14th President of the United States Franklin Pierce, founding father Nicholas Gilman, Senator Daniel Webster, Revolutionary War hero John Stark, editor Horace Greeley, founder of the Christian Science religion Mary Baker Eddy, poet Robert Frost, sculptor Daniel Chester French, astronaut Alan Shepard, rock musician Ronnie James Dio, author Dan Brown, actor Adam Sandler, inventor Dean Kamen, comedians Sarah Silverman and Seth Meyers, restaurateurs Richard and Maurice McDonald, and WWE wrestler Triple H, aka Paul Michael Levesque.

New Hampshire firsts
 In 1719, the first white potato grown in America was grown by an Irish immigrant in Londonderry.
 On January 5, 1776, at Exeter, the Provincial Congress of New Hampshire ratified the first independent constitution in the Americas, free of British rule.
 On June 12, 1800, Fernald's Island in the Piscataqua River became the first government-sanctioned U.S. Navy shipyard.
 Started in 1822, Dublin's Juvenile Library was the first free public library.
 In 1828, the first women's strike in the nation took place at Dover's Cocheco Mills.
 Founded in 1833, the Peterborough Town Library was the first public library, supported with public funds, in the world.
 On August 3, 1852, Center Harbor was the site of the first intercollegiate athletic event. Harvard defeated Yale in a  rowing race on Lake Winnipesaukee, the first meeting in a rivalry that continues to this day.
 Finished on June 27, 1874, the first trans-Atlantic telecommunications cable between Europe and America stretched from Balinskelligs Bay, Ireland, to Rye, New Hampshire.
 On February 6, 1901, a group of nine conservationists founded the Society for the Protection of New Hampshire Forests, the first forest-conservation advocacy group in the U.S.
 In 1908, Monsignor Pierre Hevey organized the nation's first credit union, "La Caisse Populaire, Ste-Marie" (The People's Bank) in Manchester, to help mill workers save and borrow money, which is now St. Mary's Bank.
 In 1930, Frank J. Mafera patented the method for manufacturing residential chain-link fencing, first selling it from his home in Raymond.
 In 1933, the League of New Hampshire Craftsmen held the first crafts fair in the nation.
 In July 1944, the Bretton Woods Agreement, the first fully negotiated system intended to govern monetary relations among independent nation-states, was signed at the Mount Washington Hotel.
 On May 5, 1961, Alan Shepard of Derry rode a Mercury spacecraft and became the first American in space.
 In 1963, New Hampshire's legislature approved the nation's first modern state lottery, which began play in 1964.
 In 1966, Ralph Baer of Sanders Associates, Inc., Nashua, recruited engineers to develop the first home video game.
 In January 1974, the first municipal recycling center in the U.S. opened in Nottingham.
 Christa McAuliffe of Concord became the first private citizen selected to venture into space. She perished with her six Challenger crewmates on January 28, 1986.
 On May 17, 1996, New Hampshire became the first state in the country to install a green LED traffic light. New Hampshire was selected because it was the first state to install the red and yellow variety statewide.
 On May 31, 2007, New Hampshire became the first state to recognize same-sex unions "without a court order or the threat of one".

See also

 Outline of New Hampshire
 List of states and territories of the United States

Notes

References

Further reading

 
 Land Use in Cornish, N.H., a 2006 documentary presentation by James M. Patterson of the Valley News, depicts various aspects of the societal and cultural environment of northern New Hampshire.

External links

State government

 
 New Hampshire Almanac
 Visitnh.gov, New Hampshire Office of Travel and Tourism Development

U.S. Government

 New Hampshire State Guide from the Library of Congress
 Energy Facts for New Hampshire
 New Hampshire State Facts, USDA Economic Research Service
 USGS real-time, geographic, and other scientific resources of New Hampshire

Other

 Internet Movie Database listing of films shot in the state
 New Hampshire Historical Society
 
 

 
States of the United States
New England states
Northeastern United States
States and territories established in 1788
States of the East Coast of the United States
1788 establishments in the United States
Contiguous United States